Avlon is an international firm whose principal activity lies in manufacturing and marketing personal care products such as creme relaxers, reconstructors, conditioners, shampoos, hair care, preservo strengthening serums, and natural textures products. Their brands include Affirm, FiberGuard, Ferm, KeraCare, KeraCare Natural Textures, Avlon Texture Release, and MoisturColor.

References

External links
Official site

Hair care products
Cosmetics companies of the United States
Companies based in Cook County, Illinois